Mark Pegg may refer to:
Mark Pegg (actor) (born 1969), British actor and film producer
Mark Gregory Pegg  (born 1963), Australian professor of medieval history